Stormy Crossing is a 1958 British crime, drama, thriller, mystery film directed by C. M. Pennington-Richards and starring John Ireland, Derek Bond, Leslie Dwyer, and Maureen Connell. John Schlesinger and Arthur Lowe appear in supporting roles. It was made at Southall Studios in West London, and released in the U.S. as Black Tide.

Plot
Two swimmers attempt to swim across the English Channel but, under cover of fog, one of them is deliberately drowned by her lover (Bond) after she demands he leave his rich wife for her or she will tell his wife about their affair. Officially, her death is ruled an accident, but her fellow swimmer is convinced that it was not. His swimming coach (Ireland) is initially doubtful, but when he realizes he has been deliberately lied to, he investigates and brings the villain to justice.

Cast
 John Ireland as Griff Parker  
 Derek Bond as Paul Seymour  
 Leslie Dwyer as Bill Harris, Kitty's Trainer  
 Maureen Connell as Shelley Baxter  
 Sheldon Lawrence as Danny Parker, Griff's Brother  
 Joy Webster as Kitty Tyndall  
 John Horsley as Detective Inspector Parry  
 Cameron Hall as Grantly Memorial Doctor  
 Arthur Lowe as Garage Owner  
 John Schlesinger as Tim, garage mechanic  
 Anita Sharp-Bolster as First Nurse
 Patricia Ellis as Pretty Young Nurse
 Jack Taylor as Race Navigator
 Reginald Hearne as Police Sergeant Masters
 Graham Stewart as Bob McEwan, Clarion Reporter
 Frank Atkinson as Joe, night porter
 Sam Rockett as Swim Organizer

References

External links

1958 films
British mystery films
Films shot at Southall Studios
Films directed by C. M. Pennington-Richards
1950s English-language films
1950s British films